Winfield Puntenney Niblo (August 5, 1912March 8, 2007) was an American educator best known for his promotion of traditional square dancing in Japan after World War II.

Recognition 
Niblo was awarded the Order of the Sacred Treasure, Gold Rays with Neck Ribbon, in 1982.

References

Square dance
1912 births
2007 deaths
American expatriates in Japan
Recipients of the Order of the Sacred Treasure